Ortueri is a comune (municipality) in the Province of Nuoro in the Italian region Sardinia, located about  north of Cagliari and about  southwest of Nuoro.

Ortueri borders the following municipalities: Austis, Busachi, Neoneli, Samugheo, Sorgono, Ula Tirso.

References

Cities and towns in Sardinia